Manic Eden were a short-lived hard rock band consisting of former members of Whitesnake and Little Caesar.

Overview
Following David Coverdale's decision to place Whitesnake on indefinite hiatus in the early 1990s, former Whitesnake members Adrian Vandenberg, Rudy Sarzo, and Tommy Aldridge elected to form a new band together. Lead vocalist James Christian of House of Lords was recruited to round out the new band; Christian, however, was fired after a short time and replaced by former Little Caesar vocalist Ron Young. No material was recorded during the time Christian was in the band.

The band released one self-titled album on 24 March 1994.

Former members
Adrian Vandenberg - guitar, keyboards (1993–1994)
Rudy Sarzo - bass (1993–1994)
Tommy Aldridge - drums, percussion (1993–1994)
James Christian - lead vocals (1993)
Ron Young - lead vocals (1993–1994)

The album 

Track listing
"Can You Feel It" - 4:15
"When the Hammer Comes Down" - 5:45
"Ride the Storm" - 4:12
"Can't Hold It" - 4:00
"Fire in My Soul" - 6:15
"Do Angels Die" - 5:34
"Crossing the Line" - 4:20
"Dark Shade of Grey" - 4:40
"Pushing Me" - 4:30
"Gimme a Shot" - 5:10
"Keep It Coming" - 4:29

Personnel
 Ron Young - lead vocals
 Adrian Vandenberg - guitar, keyboards
 Rudy Sarzo - bass
 Tommy Aldridge - drums, percussion
 CeCe White - background vocals
 Sara Taylor - background vocals
 Chris Trujillo - percussion
 Guy Allison - keyboards

References

External links
 Manic Eden Biography

English hard rock musical groups
1994 albums
Whitesnake members
Musical groups established in 1993
Musical quartets
1993 establishments in England